Cudworth Airport  was located  west south-west of Cudworth, Saskatchewan, Canada.

See also 
 List of airports in Saskatchewan
 List of defunct airports in Canada
 Cudworth Municipal Airport

References

External links 
 Page about this aerodrome on COPA's Places to Fly airport directory

Defunct airports in Saskatchewan
Hoodoo No. 401, Saskatchewan